James Wilson Morrice  (August 10, 1865 – January 23, 1924) was one of the first Canadian landscape painters to be known internationally. He studied at the Académie Julian in Paris, France, where he lived for most of his career. James Morrice Street in New Bordeaux, Ahuntsic-Cartierville, Montreal is named in his memory.

Biography
Morrice was born in Montreal, Quebec, the son of a merchant, and studied law in Toronto from 1882 to 1889. In 1890 he left to study painting in England. The next year he arrived in Paris, where he studied at the Académie Julian from 1892 to 1897. At the Académie Julian, he befriended Charles Conder and Maurice Prendergast, and also met Robert Henri. He then took lessons at the atelier of Henri Harpignies, who encouraged his students to paint en plein air.

Morrice continued to live in Paris until the First World War, although he spent most of his winters in Canada and travelled widely abroad. He made many connections in the intellectual circles of Paris, while also remaining in touch with the Canadian art world. He exhibited at the Salon d'Automne (1905) and joined the Canadian Art Club in Toronto (1907).

During this period he was also in contact with the literary milieu, with English expatriate intellectuals living in Paris, such as W. Somerset Maugham, Arnold Bennett, and Clive Bell. In 1911, he wrote Edmund Morris that there was excitement in London over the Post-Impressionism exhibition. As he wrote,Everybody laughed and jeered but with a few exceptions it consisted of good things - art that will last. In the winters of 1912 and 1912-1913, he stayed in Tangiers. His second trip coincided with a trip by Matisse whom he met and with whom he exchanged ideas about art. He was elected an honorary non-resident member of the Royal Canadian Academy in 1913.

With the advent of World War I, Morrice went to Montreal, and then to Cuba. There he began to succumb to alcoholism. The output of his last period is uneven and infrequent. In the summer of 1922 he travelled to Algiers, where he painted with Albert Marquet. This would be the last time that he painted, as his health began to rapidly deteriorate.  He died, aged 58, in Tunis.

Gallery
Morrice's paintings before the turn of the century are thinly painted and inspired by Whistler, both in sentiment and in treatment of colour. Just prior to World War I he began to paint, in a thicker style, winter Canadian scenes influenced by the Impressionists and particularly by Maurice Cullen, whom he met in 1897. Some of his works during his Caribbean period are considered his best and are painted in a loose style influenced by Post-Impressionism and suggest artists such as Matisse. He is noted for his sense of observation and ability to distill the essence of what he saw in his work, often in "pochades", little sketches. "The artist with the delicate eye", Matisse called him in 1925.

 Prow of a Gondola, Venice, 1897 National Gallery of Canada
 Return from School, 1901
 Quai des Grands-Augustins, 1903. The National Gallery of Canada
 The Ferry, Quebec, 1906. NGC
 Blanche Baume, 1912. NGC
 House in Santiago, 1915 Tate Gallery
 Village Street, West Indies, 1919. Montreal Museum of Fine Arts

Recognition and legacy
In 1958, works by Morrice along with those of Jacques de Tonnancour, Anne Kahane and Jack Nichols represented Canada at the Venice Biennale.

The Montreal Museum of Fine Arts is one of the two main repositories of his work along with the National Gallery of Canada. Montrealers David Rousseau Morrice (1903-1978) and F. Eleanore Morrice (1901-1981) willed to the Montreal Museum of Fine Arts many works of art they had collected during their lives, published as A Montreal Collection: Gift From Eleanore and David Morrice and exhibited at the Museum in 1983. Several significant gifts have enhanced the National Gallery's collection, enhanced by major publications such as Charles C. Hill's Morrice A Gift to the Nation The G. Blair Laing Collection (1992). In 2016, Ash K. Prakash gave the National Gallery a major collection of Morrice, which the National Gallery exhibited as James Wilson Morrice: The A.K. Prakash Collection in Trust to the Nation (2017) and travelled nationally (2018-2019).

References

Further reading
 
 Ash K. Prakash: Impressionism in Canada. A Journey of Rediscovery. Pref. Guy Wildenstein, introd. William H Gerdts. Arnoldsche Verlagsanstalt, Stuttgart 2014, 2. Aufl. 2015 (illustr. book, with expl. One chapter on James Wilson Morrice. Figure Sainte-Anne-de-Beaupré from 1897 on the publishers page)

External links
Web site by Morrice specialist Lucie Dorais
Biography at the Dictionary of Canadian Biography Online
A large gallery of paintings by Morrice on the National Gallery of Canada's website.

1865 births
1924 deaths
Académie Julian alumni
Artists from Montreal
Canadian male painters
Canadian landscape painters
Members of the Royal Canadian Academy of Arts
Persons of National Historic Significance (Canada)
19th-century Canadian painters
20th-century Canadian painters
Canadian Impressionist painters
19th-century Canadian male artists
20th-century Canadian male artists